Out of Light is the debut studio album of American electronic music producer and DJ Slushii, consisting of 13 songs, that was self-released under his label, Slushii on 4 August 2017.

Background 
Slushii announced the album on July 21, 2017, on Twitter. Each song from the album consists of his own "cartoonish and pitched-up" vocals.

Announcement of the album was made as Slushii underwent an emergency appendectomy. Hospitalized in Paris, his small bowel had to be removed as it troubled him.

Singles 
Previous recorded songs by Slushii such as "Dear Me", "My Senses", "Step By Step" and "I Still Recall", were also included in the album.

"Forever" on the album is a reworked version of a Deuteronomy B-side titled "Hold Me Forever", the band which Scanlan was a member from 2009 until 2013.

Track listing 
Credits adapted from Tidal.

Out of Light

Personnel 
Slushii – production, songwriting, mixing, recording, vocals
Deuteronomy – songwriting on "Forever"
Xsilvee – mixing

References 

2017 debut albums
Electronic albums by American artists
Dubstep albums